For information on all University of Dayton sports, see Dayton Flyers

The Dayton Flyers football program is the intercollegiate American football team for the University of Dayton located in the U.S. state of Ohio. The team competes in the NCAA Division I Football Championship Subdivision (FCS) and are members of the Pioneer Football League. Dayton's first football team was fielded in 1905. The team plays its home games at the 11,000 seat Welcome Stadium in Dayton, Ohio. The Flyers are coached by Rick Chamberlin.

History

Classifications
1906–1955: NCAA
1956–1972: NCAA University Division
1973–1976: NCAA Division I
1977–1992: NCAA Division III
1993–present: NCAA Division I–AA/FCS

Conference memberships
1905–1925: Independent
1926–1934: Ohio Athletic Conference
1935–1938: Buckeye Athletic Association
1939–1955: Independent
1956–1972: University Division Independent
1973–1976: Division I Independent
1977–1992: Division III Independent
1993–present: Pioneer Football League

Notable former players

Notable alumni include:
Jon A. Husted (1985-1989), Ohio lieutenant governor
Jon Gruden (1982–1984), Graduated in 1985.  Former head coach of the Tampa Bay Buccaneers and the Las Vegas Raiders.
Kelvin Kirk (1953–2003), first Mr. Irrelevant and CFL player
Gary Kosins (born 1949), American football player
Bill Lange (1928–1995), American football player
Jim Katcavage (1952–1956), New York Giants football player for 13 years and three time all-Pro defensive end.
Chuck Noll (1948-1952), Cleveland Browns player, and 4x Super Bowl winning coach for Steelers.
 Brandon Staley (2003-2004) Former Dayton Quarterback and current Head Coach of the Los Angeles Chargers
Adam Trautman (2015-2019), American football player on the New Orleans Saints. He was the first Dayton player drafted (2020) since 1977.

Championships

National championships 
Dayton has won two national championships, both during their tenure in Division III.
Dayton has made five appearances in the NCAA Division III National Championship Game, also known as the Stagg Bowl. The Flyers defeated Ithaca, 63–0 in the 1980 championship game, and defeated Union (NY) 17–7 in the 1989 championship game. The Flyers were unsuccessful in three other championship game appearances, losing 17–10 to Widener in 1981, 19–3 to Wagner in 1987, and 34–20 to Ithaca in 1991.

Conference championships 
Dayton has won 11 conference championships, six outright and five shared.

† denotes co-champions

Divisional championships
From 2001–2005, the Pioneer Football League was divided into North and South Divisions, with the winners of those divisions participating in a Conference Championship Game. As winners of the Pioneer Football League's North Division, Dayton has made two appearances in the Pioneer Football League Championship Game, in 2001 and 2002.

Bowl game appearances
Dayton has participated in one bowl game, with the Flyers having a record of 0–1.

They also played in the Gridiron Classic in 2007 against Northeast Conference opponent Albany, winning 42–21.

The Sports Network Cup was a way of determining the best mid major team in Division I FCS, with first place votes determining the winner between teams from the Pioneer Football League, the Northeast Conference, and the Metro Atlantic Athletic Conference.

Playoff appearances

NCAA Division I FCS
Dayton has made one appearance in the FCS playoffs. Their record is 0–1.

NCAA Division III
The Flyers made eleven appearances in the NCAA Division III football playoffs. Their combined record was 16–9.

References

External links

 

 
American football teams established in 1905
1905 establishments in Ohio